is a seventh-century Buddhist temple in Dazaifu, Fukuoka, Fukuoka Prefecture, Japan. It was once the most important temple in Kyushu. Its bell, one of the oldest in the country, has been designated a National Treasure, and in 1996 the Ministry of the Environment designated its sound as one of the 100 Soundscapes of Japan. Many statues of the Heian period are Important Cultural Properties.

History
According to the Shoku Nihongi, Kanzeon-ji was founded by Emperor Tenji in honour of his mother Empress Saimei, but was still incomplete fifty years later when in 709 additional workers were assigned to finish the building. The temple had a south gate, middle gate, golden hall to the west, pagoda to the east and a lecture hall in the centre. The temple's buildings were damaged and destroyed in a number of natural disasters and wars. The Kondō, 3x2 bays with mokoshi, and lecture hall were rebuilt in the Genroku era (1688-1703) and have been designated Prefectural Cultural Properties. The  were declared an Historic Site in 1970.

Treasures
Kanzeon-ji houses a National Treasure and a number of statues and other items that are Important Cultural Properties:
 of the Nara period (National Treasure)
  of the Heian period
  of the Heian period
  of the Heian period (1066)
  of the Heian period
  of the Heian period
  of the Heian period
  of the Heian period
  of the Heian period (1069)
  of the Kamakura period (1242)
  of the Heian period
  of the Heian period
  of the Heian period
  of the Heian period
  of the Heian period
  of the Kamakura period (1222)
 three  of the Kamakura period
  of the Kamakura period
  of the Nara period

A Heian period  dating to 905 and now in Tokyo has been designated a National Treasure.

See also

Dazaifu Tenman-gū
Kaidan-in
Kōmyōzen-ji
Japanese sculpture
List of National Treasures of Japan (ancient documents)
List of National Treasures of Japan (crafts: others)
List of Special Places of Scenic Beauty, Special Historic Sites and Special Natural Monuments
100 Soundscapes of Japan

References

Buddhist temples in Fukuoka Prefecture
Buildings and structures in Dazaifu, Fukuoka
Tendai temples